The Daimler Paraffin Railway was the first set of rolling stock with petrol engine. Three original vehicles for passenger and goods transport are exhibited in the Mercedes-Benz Museum in Stuttgart.

History

Motor-Draisine 
In 1887, the pioneer of the German automotive industry, Gottlieb Daimler, developed a motor-driven draisine, which used paraffin (kerosene) as fuel. It was the first piece of rolling stock with an internal combustion engine. It was successfully tested in summer 1887 between Esslingen and Kirchheim/Teck.

Motor-Waggonet
Gottlieb Daimler demonstrated in 1887 on the Cannstatter Volksfest a paraffin driven narrow gauge railway. It was well received as a convenient means of passenger transport between Wilhelmsplatz and Kursaal. Starting in 1890, he sold an improved variant under the Waggonet trade mark. On each side, there was a bench with six seats. The driver sat on a saddle behind the upright standing motor, which was installed in a box.

The Farming and foresting Exhibition was held in Vienna from 14 May to 30 October 1890. The organisers wanted to provide easy access for the attendees. The entrepreneur Josef Bierenz installed and operated a narrow gauge passenger tramway using Daimler Waggonets from the Praterstern the western entrance of the fair centre at Rotunderplatz. It was used all summer and transported thousands of passengers. Each train consisted of a Waggonet and a trailer and offered space for 24 passengers. One vehicle is mothballed in the archive of the Vienna Technical Museum but currently not being exhibited.

Motor Locomotive 
The Daimler Motor Locomotive was a more powerful variant with 4,6 hp (3,4 kW). The original displayed at the Mercedes Museum was used up to 1918 as an industrial narrow gauge locomotive.

See also 
 Petrol-paraffin engine

References 

Rolling stock of Germany
Internal combustion engine technology
Paraffin Railway